Lugovoye was a rural locality (a selo) in Novinsky Selsoviet of Belogorsky District, Amur Oblast, Russia. The population is 41 as of 2018. There are 3 streets.

Geography 
Lugovoye is located 55 km southeast of Belogorsk (the district's administrative centre) by road. Mostovoye is the nearest rural locality.

References 

Rural localities in Belogorsky District